Alena Dylko (born 14 September 1988 in Kossovo, Belarus) is a Belarusian track cyclist. At the 2012 Summer Olympics, she competed in the Women's team pursuit for the national team.

References

Belarusian female cyclists
1988 births
Living people
Olympic cyclists of Belarus
Cyclists at the 2012 Summer Olympics
Belarusian track cyclists